Curvularin is an antimicrobial made by Penicillium and Curvularia.

References

External links
Fermentek Curvularin

Antibiotics
Lactones
Heterocyclic compounds with 2 rings
Phenols